The academic dress of the Robert Gordon University is normally only worn at graduation ceremonies and occasionally at other very formal events. In common with most British universities, a graduand of the Robert Gordon University begins the ceremony wearing the dress of the degree to which they are being admitted except for the hood. This is in contrast to the practice at some universities such as Oxford where a graduand only dons the dress of a degree after it has been conferred. The current pattern of academic dress dates from 1992 when the institution became a university.

Gowns

For all bachelor's degrees (e.g. BA, BSc, etc.) and integrated Masters (e.g. MPharm, MEng etc.) a black gown is worn, ending  from the ground. For all other master's degrees except MPhil (e.g. MSc, MBA), a black gown is worn, ending  from the ground, while for MPhil the gown is the same but also has facings of white silk  in width. For Doctoral degrees (e.g. PhD), the Doctor's black robe (a black Panama gown) is worn; the Doctor's robe has front edges and sleeves in white silk. The Chancellor's robe is of black silk with front edges and fringes of pale gold, while the Principal/Vice-Chancellor's gown is the same but with front edges and fringes in white. For higher doctorates (including honorary doctorate), the robe is scarlet with white front edges.

Hoods and headdress

All hoods are black and white and do not vary in colour by academic discipline, and all are of Cambridge shape. The hood is only put on after the degree has been awarded. For all bachelor's degrees, the hood is black, partially lined with white silk embossed with symbols from the university's coat of arms (the castle, torch, and mechanical cog) and has a black square backpiece (known as the "cape"). For master's degrees, the hood is black and fully lined and edged in white silk embossed with the same symbols from the coat of arms, and the cape also edged in white silk  in width. For Doctoral degrees the hood is as for master's degrees but with a  band of white silk around the cape, while for higher doctorates and honorary doctorates the hood is scarlet and lined with white silk. For all bachelor's and master's degrees, headdress is a plain black mortarboard while for Doctoral degrees, headdress consists of a black Tudor bonnet with white cord and tassels. Recipients of higher doctorates and honorary doctorates wear the same bonnet but with gold cord and tassels.

References

Robert Gordon
Robert Gordon University